
The following lists events that happened during 1809 in South Africa.

Events
 The governor of the Cape, Earl of Caledon, declares that the Khoikhoi had to have a fixed residence and could not migrate between regions without written authority (Hottentot Proclamation).
 Gola's Xhosa community settles at Pramberg.
 A severe drought occurs in the eastern frontier area.
 More Xhosa clans push westward into the neutral zone between the Sundays and the Great Fish Rivers. The British send in seasoned troops.

Births

References

See Years in South Africa for list of References

History of South Africa